Kampen om Næsbygård is a 1964 Danish family film directed by Ib Mossin and Alice O'Fredericks.

Cast
 Asbjørn Andersen as Godsejer Martin
 Karen Berg as Helene
 Ole Wisborg as Torben
 Poul Reichhardt as Præsten Prip
 Inger Stender as Præstekonen Anna
 Agnes Rehni as Tante Thyra
 Ib Mossin as Anker
 Jane Thomsen as Præstedatteren Rosa
 Ole Neumann as Martin Jr.
 Helga Frier as Kokkepigen Marie
 Marie-Louise Coninck as Stuepigen Erna
 Einar Juhl as Sagføreren
 Knud Schrøder as Bookmaker
 Holger Vistisen as Bookmaker
 Yvonne Ekmann as Torben's kæreste
 Palle Huld as Lægen
 Peter Malberg as Gartneren Ole
 Christian Arhoff as Gartneren Nick
 Gunnar Hansen as TV reporter

References

External links

1964 films
Danish children's films
1960s Danish-language films
Films directed by Alice O'Fredericks
Films scored by Sven Gyldmark
ASA Filmudlejning films